The 17th G7 Summit was held in London, England, United Kingdom between 15 and 17 July 1991. The venue for the summit meetings was Lancaster House in London.
 
The Group of Seven (G7) was an unofficial forum which brought together the heads of the richest industrialized countries: France, Germany, Italy, Japan, the United Kingdom, the United States, Canada (since 1976), and the President of the European Commission (starting officially in 1981). The summits were not meant to be linked formally with wider international institutions; and in fact, a mild rebellion against the stiff formality of other international meetings was a part of the genesis of cooperation between France's president Valéry Giscard d'Estaing and West Germany's chancellor Helmut Schmidt as they conceived the first Group of Six (G6) summit in 1975.

Leaders at the summit

The G7 is an unofficial annual forum for the leaders of Canada, the European Commission, France, Germany, Italy, Japan, the United Kingdom, and the United States.

The 17th G7 summit was the first summit for British Prime Minister John Major. It was also the last summit for Italian Prime Minister Giulio Andreotti and Japanese Prime Minister Toshiki Kaifu.

Participants
These summit participants are the current "core members" of the international forum:

Major sent a letter to other members of the G7, asking for their permission to invite Mikhail Gorbachev, who has been pressing to come to London to plead for more Western economic support for his country. Pressure to invite Gorbachev had come mainly from the leaders of France, Germany, and Italy who have made public appeals for him to be invited to attend; but Britain sent the official invitation inviting the Soviet Union to participate. A wry comment which was oft repeated during the summit was that G7 had become the G8½ with the participation of the European Community and the meetings with Gorbachev.

Issues

The summit was intended as a venue for resolving differences among its members. As a practical matter, the summit was also conceived as an opportunity for its members to give each other mutual encouragement in the face of difficult economic decisions. In anticipation of this conference, a new 35-foot-long table was built for the Long Gallery, where the main negotiating sessions were planned to unfold. Issues which were discussed at this summit included:
 Economic Policy 
 International Trade 
 Energy 
 Central and Eastern Europe 
 The Soviet Union 
 The Middle East 
 The Developing Countries and Debt 
 Environment 
 Drugs 
 Migration

Accomplishments
In 1991, the summit leaders proclaimed "concern" about protecting existing forests, but there is little evidence of follow-up action.

Gallery

Core G7 members

Guest Invitees

See also
 G8
 List of Soviet Union–United States summits

Notes

References
 Bayne, Nicholas and Robert D. Putnam. (2000).  Hanging in There: The G7 and G8 Summit in Maturity and Renewal. Aldershot, Hampshire, England: Ashgate Publishing. ; OCLC 43186692
 Reinalda, Bob and Bertjan Verbeek. (1998).  Autonomous Policy Making by International Organizations. London: Routledge.  ; ;

External links
 No official website is created for any G7 summit prior to 1995 -- see the 21st G7 summit.
 University of Toronto: G8 Research Group, G8 Information Centre
  G7 1991, delegations & documents

1990s in the City of Westminster
G7 summit
1991 in international relations
G7 summit
G7 summit 1991
G7 summit 1991
Events in London
1991
July 1991 events in the United Kingdom